Matteo Marrai (born 17 November 1986) is a former professional tennis player from Italy.

Biography
Marrai was born in Pisa and started playing tennis aged six. He played mostly on the Futures circuit, where he won a total of 21 titles. His only appearance in the main draw of an ATP Tour tournament came at the 2008 Open Sabadell Atlántico Barcelona, as a qualifier. After beating Mikhail Ledovskikh and Andrey Golubev in qualifying, he lost in first round to Barcelona local Alberto Martín. He took part in the qualifying competition at the 2009 Australian Open and was eliminated in the opening round. At the 2009 Mediterranean Games, Marrai lost the bronze medal match to Gianluca Naso, but teamed up with Naso to win gold in men's doubles, over a pair from Montenegro. He retired from tennis in 2014.

References

External links
 
 

1986 births
Living people
Italian male tennis players
Mediterranean Games gold medalists for Italy
Sportspeople from Pisa
Mediterranean Games medalists in tennis
Competitors at the 2009 Mediterranean Games